Richard Gustave Olson Jr. (born 1959) is an American diplomat and career foreign service officer, who formerly served as the United States Ambassador to Pakistan. Prior to his appointment in Pakistan, Olson had served as U.S. Ambassador to the United Arab Emirates as well the Coordinating Director for Development and Economic Affairs in the U.S. Embassy, Kabul with the rank of ambassador. He is a career member of the Foreign Service, class of Career Minister.

Personal life and education
Olson was married to Deborah K. Jones, the former United States Ambassador to Libya. They have two daughters.

Olson earned an undergraduate degree in law and society, and history from Brown University in 1981.

Career
 
Olson joined the U.S. State Department in 1982, and served tenures in Mexico, Uganda, Tunisia, Saudi Arabia, Ethiopia and Iraq, and three tours in the United Arab Emirates.

Olson has also served as the deputy chief of mission at the United States Mission to the North Atlantic Treaty Organization (NATO) from 2006 to 2008.

He served as U.S. Consul General in Dubai from 2001 to 2003. From 2008 to 2011, Olson was the U.S. Ambassador to the United Arab Emirates.

Olson served as Coordinating Director for Development and Economic Affairs at the U.S. embassy in Kabul, from June 2011 to June 2012.

In 2012, Cameron Munter resigned as the United States ambassador to Pakistan after relations between Pakistan and the United States were deteriorated following the US forces raid killed Osama bin Laden in Pakistan. The President of United States Barack Obama nominated Olson for ambassadorship which the United States Senate approved. He presented his credentials to President Asif Ali Zardari on October 31, 2012.

In April 2022, Olson agreed to plead guilty to federal charges for his role in a lobbying campaign involving the Qatari government.

Awards and honors
Olson has been awarded the Presidential Distinguished Service Award and the Secretary of Defense's Exceptional Civilian Service Award, and he is a three times recipient of the State Department's Superior Honor Award.

References

External links 

 American Embassy in Islamabad

|-

|-

1959 births
Ambassadors of the United States to Pakistan
Ambassadors of the United States to the United Arab Emirates
Brown University alumni
Living people
United States Special Envoys
United States Foreign Service personnel
Virginia politicians convicted of crimes